The United States Department of State’s Operations Center (S/ES-O) monitors world events, prepares written briefs for the Secretary of State and other U.S. State Department senior officials, and facilitates communication between the State Department and the rest of the world.

Mission and activities
As part of the Executive Secretariat, located in State Department's headquarters in Washington, D.C., the Operations Center provides senior policy makers with alerts and briefings on world events affecting U.S. interests abroad. The organization's mission is to get the right information to the right people at the right time. To do so, the Operations Center is open 24 hours a day, 365 days a year. In addition to day-to-day operations, when a crisis arises, the Operations Center may set up a task force to address logistics and, in conjunction with the Consular Affairs bureau, assists U.S. citizens in need. In response to the earthquake in Haiti in 2010, as with many other crises, the Operations Center convened a task force to assist in coordinating humanitarian response, informing domestic and foreign officials, and aiding American citizens.

History and activities
The Operations Center was inaugurated in 1961 at the instruction of President John F. Kennedy. When the President could not reach anyone at State in the midst of a political crisis, he realized the importance of maintaining a crisis response center. At its inception, only one watch officer staffed the Operations Center supplied with a GI-issue bunk bed, a water pitcher, and a telephone. Since then, the Operations Center has grown with the needs of the Secretary of State and the expanding U.S. diplomatic presence around the world. The Operations Center is made up of two parts: The Watch and Crisis Management Support.

The Watch

The Operations Center handles approximately 340,000 calls annually. It is staffed by Watchstanders who work in shifts to provide coverage around the clock. At any moment, one of the State Department's top leaders might call in requesting information on breaking news stories. These incoming calls overlap with the near constant intake of press and cable traffic. Watchstanders receive and process this information as a team. As Watchstanders receive information, they assess its importance and reach out to embassies and consulates overseas, as well as country desk officers at headquarters, to contextualize the information. The most relevant items are shared with senior officials  through daily written and oral briefs.

Crisis Management and Strategy

Officers in Crisis Management and Strategy (CMS) analyze information with an eye towards anticipating future hot spots around the world. By preparing for crises before they arise, CMS helps embassies and consulates abroad adjust their security protocols for any natural disaster or potential source of conflict. When a crisis does happen, CMS oversees tasks forces, managing coordination within the State Department and between interagency actors.

In the Media: Reflecting on 50 Years of Service

The Operations Center recently celebrated its fiftieth anniversary. Secretary of State Hillary Clinton marked this occasion by sharing some of her memorable interactions with the Operations Center. In one instance, she called asking to speak with an ambassador visiting Washington. A few minutes later, a Watch Officer connected her. Only later did she learn that the Ambassador did not have his cell phone with him. The Operations Center officers had called the Ambassador’s temporary residence and learned that the concierge had recommended three restaurants, but did not know which one he had chosen.  Within minutes, while Secretary Clinton remained on the line, the officers dialed the restaurants, circulated a picture of the Ambassador, and requested that the waitstaff scan the premise for his party. A Watch Officer connected the Secretary with the Ambassador so quickly she was not initially aware of the exhaustive search process.  As Secretary Clinton stated later on, “That is perseverance!” Secretary Clinton also highlighted the office's role in rescuing a downed American pilot in Libya, a story which illustrates the international reach of the Operation Center's reputation. A Libyan man who had received an education grant from the U.S. government found the pilot and called the Operations Center. The Watch Officer then called the U.S. Department of Defense, who promptly arranged his rescue. These stories highlight how the Operations Center supports the State Department's goal of serving American citizens and safeguarding U.S. interests abroad.

References

United States Department of State
United States Department of State agencies